William Wyman Sherwood (born March 14, 1965) is an American multi-instrumentalist, songwriter, singer, record producer and mixing engineer. He is best known for his tenures in the English progressive rock band Yes as guitarist and keyboardist in 1994 and from 1997 to 2000 and as bassist since 2015, following the death of original bassist Chris Squire. He is known for working with former and current Yes members on other projects as well.

In addition to his involvement with Yes, Sherwood is the frontman of progressive rock groups World Trade, Circa and formerly Lodgic. In 2017, he joined Asia after the death of original singer and bassist John Wetton. Outside of these bands, Sherwood has worked as a producer since the 1990s, most notably on tribute albums dedicated to Pink Floyd, The Beatles, Queen and many others. He is also a solo artist, having released ten studio albums to date.

Early life
Sherwood was born on March 14, 1965, in Las Vegas, Nevada. He was born into a musical family; his father Bobby Sherwood was an actor, musician, and big band leader and his mother Phyllis is a former singer and drummer. His brother Michael was a singer and keyboardist. Sherwood's godfather was late comedian Milton Berle.

Career

Lodgic and World Trade
Sherwood's music career started when he joined a band called Lodgic formed by his brother Michael. Billy played bass and sang, while Michael played keyboards and sang back up. Lodgic also included Guy Allison on keyboards, Jimmy Haun on guitar and Gary Starns on drums. They eventually moved the band to Los Angeles in 1980. After many years of trying to get things together, they recorded their debut album Nomadic Sands, released in 1985.

After Lodgic broke up, Sherwood put together a new band with Guy Allison. They recruited guitarist Bruce Gowdy and drummer Mark T. Williams to form World Trade. They recorded their self-titled debut in 1989, with Sherwood taking on the roles of engineer, mixer, and producer again, along with his band duties as bassist and lead singer. Sherwood got back together with his bandmates from World Trade and released Euphoria in 1995, with Jay Schellen replacing Williams on drums.

In 2017, Sherwood reunited with World Trade to record a third album titled Unify, which was released on August 4, 2017.

Yes
By 1989, Sherwood was invited to meet Yes bassist Chris Squire after singer and record executive Derek Shulman suggested his name. By this time, Yes had suffered a setback when singer Jon Anderson had left and formed Anderson Bruford Wakeman Howe (ABWH). Sherwood was invited to jam with the remaining Yes members, Squire, guitarist Trevor Rabin, drummer Alan White, and keyboardist Tony Kaye, with the intention of Sherwood on lead vocals. By the time the five had recorded some demos, they merged with members of ABWH in 1990 to become an eight-man formation of Yes, which lasted until 1992. The two groups recorded songs for Union (1991), which features the first song that Sherwood and Squire wrote together, "The More We Live - Let Go". Sherwood struck up a friendship with Squire that would lead him to work with him throughout the next 20 years.

In 1994, Sherwood toured with Yes as additional guitarist and keyboardist on their tour supporting Talk (1994). Sherwood would co-produce, engineer and mix the new studio tracks for their following studio albums, Keys to Ascension (1996) and Keys to Ascension 2 (1997). Following Rick Wakeman's departure in 1997 Sherwood and Squire continued to write songs, which Yes decided to record for their next studio album, Open Your Eyes (1997). This made Sherwood become a full-time member of the group, playing rhythm guitar and keyboards. The addition of Igor Khoroshev in 1997 left Sherwood to handle backing guitar and vocals for live shows. In 2000, after recording and touring their next album, The Ladder (1999), Sherwood left the group. A live album and DVD of the show at the House of Blues in Las Vegas, Sherwood's hometown, was released as House of Yes: Live from House of Blues.

On May 19, 2015, it was officially announced that Squire would be undergoing treatment for acute erythroid leukemia, and that Yes would continue their 2015 North American tour with Sherwood filling Squire's role. After Squire's passing on June 27, 2015, Sherwood (along with other former and current members of Yes) made a public statement expressing his grief. In regards to his new role as the now-permanent bassist for Yes: "Chris said to me, 'play the music, be yourself and make me proud'. It's my true desire now [to] live up to his wishes." His first studio album with Yes after returning to the band was The Quest (2021).

Conspiracy
After his departure from Yes, Sherwood worked with Squire to release the album Conspiracy, which includes some work they composed together some years before.

In 2003, Sherwood released The Unknown, another album with Chris Squire as Conspiracy.

More recently, Sherwood has been working on further tribute albums, notably Back Against the Wall and Return to the Dark Side of the Moon, tributes to Pink Floyd's The Wall and The Dark Side of the Moon respectively. The latter includes a new track recorded with Tony Kaye.

Circa and Yoso
In 2007, a new band with Sherwood, Alan White, Tony Kaye and Jimmy Haun was announced, called Circa. With the release of their debut album Circa 2007 and a live DVD concert, Circa has played various live dates. White left the band and was replaced by Jay Schellen.

On January 14, 2009, Circa self-released on the Internet its second studio album, Circa HQ. This time, White was not available due to his commitments with Yes (who had begun a new tour). Sherwood's long time friend, collaborator and drummer, Jay Schellen, replaced White on the album. After a short international tour, Sherwood and co. started another project with former Toto singer, Bobby Kimball. Kimball, Sherwood, Tony Kaye and Jimmy Haun formed new band, Yoso, with a debut studio album in April 2009. Haun later abandoned the line-up (in order to focus on his work for adverts). He was replaced by Yes tribute band guitarist, Johnny Bruhns. Schellen chose to focus on his work in Asia Featuring John Payne and, after a number of other drummers, the band toured with Scott Connor on drums. Yoso then disbanded.

In 2011, Circa returned with a new line-up of Sherwood, Kaye, Bruhns and Connor, while Sherwood released his fifth solo album, What was the Question?. In 2012, Sherwood wrote, produced, arranged and performed on The Prog Collective, an album featuring vocal or instrumental contributions from many of the progressive rock artists he had worked with over the years. He reprised the concept with a similar collection of artists for Epilogue, released in 2013.

On October 8, 2013, they released the official video to William Shatner's record Ponder The Mystery, followed by a sold-out tour with Circa. Ponder The Mystery also features appearances of Steve Vai, Robby Krieger, Al Di Meola, George Duke, Vince Gill, Dave Koz, Rick Wakeman and Edgar Winter.

On July 8, 2016, Sherwood re-grouped with Circa to release their fourth album titled Valley Of The Windmill.

Other projects
During the hiatus of Yes, Squire put together the Chris Squire Experiment, having Sherwood as co-lead singer while playing some guitar and keyboards. Sherwood then went on to record a project called The Key with guitarist Marty Walsh, though they would not release the album until 1997.

Behind the board, Sherwood worked with Motörhead, Dangerous Toys, and Paul Rodgers (formerly of Free and Bad Company) as producer and engineer. Sherwood also guested on Toto's Kingdom of Desire album, singing and playing bass. He also produced a couple of tribute albums, including Jeffology, a tribute to Jeff Beck. Sherwood then joined Yes on tour as an additional musician, playing guitar and keyboards for their tour in support of Talk.

Sherwood appeared along with William Shatner in the Season 14 premiere of Hell's Kitchen where they met blue team as part of their reward for winning the signature dish challenge.

Sherwood is also credited for writing the theme song for the online anime series, Kung Fu Jimmy Chow.

Sherwood worked as producer, mixer and engineer, including on more tribute albums: Dragon Attack, a tribute to Queen; Salute to AC/DC; and Crossfire, a tribute to Stevie Ray Vaughan.

On 11 January 2017, Asia announced that Sherwood would be filling in on bass and lead vocals for John Wetton for tour dates in the spring of 2017 while Wetton underwent chemotherapy, having been chosen by Wetton himself. Wetton died on 31 January 2017 and the tour went forward with Sherwood. In 2019, Asia's line-up changed with Ron "Bumblefoot" Thal joining on guitar and lead vocals and Sherwood remaining on just bass and backing vocals.

In May 2019, Billy and his partner Elisa Furr, along with Jay Schellen, Guy Allison and John Thomas (who has worked with Vixen) formed a new band together featuring Furr on vocals.

In July 2020, fellow Yes member Jon Davison announced a new side project with himself, Sherwood and Schellen called Arc of Life. He also said they had completed an album that would be released late 2020 or early 2021. In early 2021, Dave Kerzner revealed the rest of the band as himself and Jimmy Haun. The album was released on February 12, 2021.

Solo career
In 1999, Sherwood composed his first solo album called The Big Peace in which he played most of the instruments and also produced. The album was intended to be a back-to-basics of his progressive roots.

In August 2008, Billy Sherwood's released his third solo album, At the Speed of Life, for which he received an award that year as the best Progressive Rock Producer.

On May 20, 2019, it was announced that Sherwood was working on his tenth solo album, titled Citizen: In The Next Life, which was released on July 12, 2019.

Equipment
Sherwood mainly plays Carvin guitars, 6- and 12-string; his main guitar, which he's played since his first stint in Yes, is a red Carvin, Telecaster-shaped, with a Roland V-guitar pickup. His acoustic guitars are made by Babicz. He uses Line 6 amplifiers with 4x12" cabinets.

As a bassist, Sherwood plays Spector basses through Tech-21 amps with 2-4X12" cabinets. He has previously played Kubicki, Tobias, Fender and Turner basses and still plays many of these in studio sessions. As of 2022, he has been seen playing Ibanez basses in addition to his Spector instruments.

Discography
Solo albums
The Big Peace (1999)
No Comment (2003)
At the Speed of Life (2008)
Oneirology (2010)
What Was the Question? (2011)
 The Art of Survival (2012)
 Divided by One (2014)
 Collection (2015), compilation with two exclusive tracks
 Archived (2015), album sold at Yes concerts during their 2015 tour, availability on Sherwood's website in 2016
 Citizen (2015)
 Citizen: In The Next Life (2019)

With World Trade
World Trade (1989)
Euphoria (1995)
Unify (2017) 

With Lodgic
Nomadic Sands (1985)

With Yes
Open Your Eyes (1997)
The Ladder (1999)
House of Yes: Live from House of Blues (2000)
Topographic Drama – Live Across America (2017)
Yes 50 Live (2019)
The Royal Affair Tour: Live from Las Vegas (2020)
 The Quest (2021)
 Mirror to the Sky (2023)
Also: production, songwriting and various instruments on Union (1991), and mixing on Keys to Ascension (1996), Keys to Ascension 2 (1997), Heaven & Earth (2014), Like It Is: Yes at the Bristol Hippodrome (2014) and Like It Is: Yes at the Mesa Arts Center (2015)

With Conspiracy
Conspiracy (2000)
The Unknown (2003)
Conspiracy Live (2006)

With Circa
Circa 2007 (2007)
Circa Live (2009, + DVD 2008)
Circa HQ (2009)
Overflow (2009)
And So On (2011)
Live From Here There & Everywhere (2013)
Valley Of The Windmill (2016)

With The Prog Collective
The Prog Collective (2012)
Epilogue (2013)
Worlds on Hold (2021)
Songs We Were Taught (2022)

With Yoso
Elements (2010)

With Mabel Greer's Toyshop
New Way of Life (2014)
The Secret (2017)

With Light Freedom Revival
Eterniverse Deja Vu (2017)
Truthonomy (2018)

With Arc of Life
Arc of Life (2021)
 Don’t Look Down (2022)

Solo production credits
 Back Against The Wall (2005)
 Return to the Dark Side of the Moon (2006)
 Songs of the Century: An All-Star Tribute to Supertramp (2012)

Other appearances
Deep Purple – Slaves and Masters (1990)
Yes – Yesyears (1991)
Yes – Union (1991)
Regulators – The Regulators (1991)
Toto – Kingdom of Desire (1992)
Motörhead – March ör Die (1992)
Air Supply – The Vanishing Race (1993)
Paul Rodgers – Muddy Water Blues: A Tribute to Muddy Waters (1993)
Dangerous Toys – Pissed (1994)
Various Artists – Supper's Ready (1995)
Various Artists – The Moon Revisited (1995)
Various Artists – Tales From Yesterday (1995)
Pam Thum – Faithful (1995)
Air Supply – News from Nowhere (1995)
Yes – Keys to Ascension (1996)
Def Leppard – All I Want Is Everything (1996)
Various Artists – Crossfire: A Salute To Stevie Ray Vaughan (1996)
Yes – Keys to Ascension (1997)
Various Artists – Dragon Attack: A Tribute To Queen (1997)
Paul Rodgers – Chronicle (1997)
The Key – The World is Watching (1997)
Treason – Treason (1997)
Ratt – Collage (1997)
Carmine Appice – Guitar Zeus (1997)
Flambookey – Flambookey (1997)
Various Artists – Thunderbolt-A Tribute To AC/DC (1998)
Michael Sherwood – Tangletown (1998)
Regulators – Bar & Grill (1998)
Quiet Riot – Alive and Well (1999)
Carmine Appice – Guitar zeus: Japan (2000)
Yes – Keystudio (2001)
Fear Factory – Digimortal (2001)
Carmine Appice – Guitar Zeus: Korea (2002)
Jack Russell – For You (2002)
Todd Rundgren – Todd Rundgren And His Friends (2002)
Medwyn Goodall – Anam Cara
Various Artists – Pigs & Pyramids-An All Star Lineup Performing The Songs of Pink Floyd (2002)
Ignition – Ignition (2003)
Various Artists – Bat Head Soup-A Tribute To Ozzy Osbourne (2003)
Asia – Silent Nation (2004)
John 5 – Vertigo (2004)
Larry Klimas – Retro-Spec(t) (2004)
Michael Schenker – Heavy Hitters (2005)
Various Artists – Back Against The Wall (2005)
Edgar Winter – The Better Deal (2006)
Various Artists – Return to the Dark Side of the Moon (2006)
Various Artists – An '80s Metal Tribute To Journey (2006)
Various Artists – Lights Out: The Ultimate Tribute To UFO (2006)
Various Artists – An All-Star Tribute To Lynyrd Skynyrd (2007)
Graham Russell – The Future (2007)
Hollywood Roses – Dopesnake (2007)
Various Artists – 70's Box: The Sound Of A Decade (2007)
Julie Francis – Lucky Penny (2008)
Various Artists – Led Box: The Ultimate Tribute To Led Zeppelin (2008)
Various Artists – Big Movies, Big Music Volume 1 (2008)
Various Artists – Big Networks, Big Music Volume 2 (2008)
Various Artists – Big Networks, Big Music Volume 9 (2008)
Various Artists – Ultimate Holiday Party Volume 1 (2008)
Various Artists – Ultimate Christmas Party Volume 2 (2008)
Various Artists – Ultimate Christmas Party Volume 3 (2008)
Various Artists – A Tribute To Thin Lizzy (2008)
Various Artists – Abbey Road: A Tribute To The Beatles (2009)
Eureka – Shackleton's Voyage (2009)
Various Artists – An All-Star Salute to Christmas (2010)
Nigel Briggs – Unwind (2010)
Mars Hollow – World in Front of Me (2011)
John Wetton – Raised in Captivity (2011)
Flaming Row – Elinoire (2011)
Michael Schenker Group – By Invitation Only
Sonic Elements – XYZ—A Tribute to Rush (2012)
Jay Tausig – Pisces (2012)
Various Artists – Songs of the Century: An All-Star Tribute to Supertramp (2012)
Various Artists – Black on Blues – A Tribute to The Black Keys (2012)
The Fusion Syndicate – The Fusion Syndicate (2012)
Edison's Lab – Edison's Lab EP (2012)
Blackburner – Planet Earth Attack (2012)
Nektar – A Spoonful of Time (2012)
Nektar – Time Machine (2013)
Days Between Stations – In Extremis (2013)
Sons of Hippies – Griffones at the Gates of Heaven (2013)
William Shatner – Ponder The Mystery (2013)
Dale Bozzio/Missing Persons – Missing in Action (2014)
Spirits Burning - Starhawk (2015)
Leon Alvarado – The Future Left Behind (2016)
Peter Banks - Be Well, Be Safe, Be Lucky... The Anthology (2018)
John Holden - Capture Light (2018)
David Cross and Peter Banks - Crossover (2020)
John Holden - Rise and Fall (2020)

References

External links
Billy Sherwood discography
Career Retrospective Interview from January 2016 with Pods & Sods

1965 births
Living people
People from the Las Vegas Valley
Record producers from Nevada
American rock guitarists
American male guitarists
Yes (band) members
Yoso members
Circa (band) members
American rock bass guitarists
American male bass guitarists
American multi-instrumentalists
American male singers
American rock singers
Songwriters from Nevada
20th-century American guitarists
Frontiers Records artists
Cherry Red Records artists
The Chris Squire Experiment members
Conspiracy (band) members
Asia (band) members